Muhammad Dabiruddin Joardar is a politician of Jhenaidah District of Bangladesh and former member of Parliament for Jhenaidah-1 constituency in 1988.

Career 
Joardar was elected to parliament from Jhenaidah-1 constituency in as an independent candidate in 1988 Bangladeshi general election. He was defeated from Jhenaidah-1 constituency as an independent candidate in the fifth parliamentary elections of 1991.

References 

Living people
Year of birth missing (living people)
People from Jhenaidah District
Jatiya Samajtantrik Dal politicians
4th Jatiya Sangsad members